Happy Go Lucky (French: Au petit bonheur) is a 1946 French comedy film directed by Marcel L'Herbier and starring Danielle Darrieux, André Luguet and François Périer. The film's sets were designed by the art director Jacques Colombier.

Cast
 Danielle Darrieux as Martine Carignol  
 André Luguet as Alain Plessis  
 François Périer as Denis Carignol  
 Jacques-Henry Duval as Archibald  
 Paulette Dubost as Brigitte Ancelin  
 Henri Crémieux as Le commissaire 
 Fred Pasquali as Germain  
 Robert Seller  as Benjamin 
 Marcel Maupi as Le gargiste 
 Claudette Falco as Sophie 
 Paul Barge
 Rolande Haumont 
 Cécyl Marcyl   
 Odette Talazac

References

Bibliography 
 Rège, Philippe. Encyclopedia of French Film Directors, Volume 1. Scarecrow Press, 2009.

External links 
 

1946 films
1946 comedy films
French comedy films
1940s French-language films
Films directed by Marcel L'Herbier
Pathé films
French black-and-white films
1940s French films